Ernfrid Cart Malmgren (Köping, 3 November 1899 – 28 March 1970) was a Swedish Esperantist, teacher, and president of the Universal Esperanto Association (UEA).

Publications 

 Esperanto kaj ĝia instruado en lernejoj (laŭ materialo de Somera Pedagogia Semajno en Kranjska Gora de 26a julio ĝis 1a aŭgusto 1957, red. Peter Zlatnar, antauparolo de E. Malmgren. - Jugoslavia Esperanto-Federacio, 1959. - 200 p.)
 La nuna stato de la instruado de la internacia lingvo en la lernejoj (Ivo Lapenna kunlabore kun E. Malmgren, D. Kennedy, 1963)
 Allas andra spraak Esperanto (1957)
 Amikaro adiaŭas amatan Stellan Engholm
 La Esperanto-Klubo: kial fondi ĝin, kiel fondi ĝin, kiaj estu la programoj (1933)
 Per kio ni amuzu nin? Societ- kaj dancludoj (de Jakob Rosenberg; Ernfrid Malmgren. - 1934
 Systematický kurs mezinárodního jazyka Esperanto (Henrik Seppik; Ernfrid Malmgren - en la ĉeĥan trad. Ladislav Krajc. 1938)
 Systematisk kurs i Esperanto (Henrik Seppik; Ernfrid Malmgren. - 1932)
 Esperanto keele süstemaatiline kursus (Henrik Seppik; Ernfrid Malmgren. - 1936)
 Sveda kantareto (1931)

See also
President of the World Esperanto Association.

References

1899 births
1970 deaths
Presidents of the Universal Esperanto Association
Swedish Esperantists